The following is a list of leaders of the Dagestan Autonomous Soviet Socialist Republic (the Dagestan ASSR). It lists heads of state, heads of government and heads of the local branch of the Communist Party of the Soviet Union.

During its existence, the Dagestan ASSR was a part of the Russian Soviet Federative Socialist Republic (the Russian SFSR).

Heads of state

Heads of government

Heads of party

See also
 Head of the Republic of Dagestan
 History of Dagestan
 Dagestan Autonomous Soviet Socialist Republic

References

Sources
 World Statesmen.org

Dagestan ASSR leaders
Dagestan ASSR leaders
Dagestan ASSR Head of State
Dagestan ASSR
Dagestan ASSR
Politics of the Soviet Union